Hollandsche Schouwburg (English: Hollandic Theatre) is a museum in Amsterdam in the Netherlands.

History

Originally, the Hollandsche Schouwburg was a Dutch theatre, but it was deemed a Jewish theatre in 1941 by Nazi occupiers, and it was later used as a deportation center during the Holocaust in the Netherlands.

On 4 May 1962,  the theater was dedicated as a general memorial site by the mayor of Amsterdam. The auditorium of the theater was dedicated as a memorial to the Dutch victims of the Holocaust.

The illustrious personnel of the nursery opposite the Hollandsche Schouwburg located at the Plantage Middenlaan in Amsterdam saved many Jewish children. This is described in the book of resistance member Betty Goudsmit-Oudkerk.

The Jewish Historical Museum took over administration of the building in 1992. Renovations the following year added a memorial room and an exhibition and a wall engraved with some 6,700 surnames of the more than 100,000 Jewish deportees from the Netherlands.

References

External links 
 

Holocaust museums
Museums in Amsterdam
Former theatres in the Netherlands
World War II museums in the Netherlands
Holocaust locations in the Netherlands